Wadecki is a surname. Notable people with the surname include:

Adam Wadecki (born 1977), Polish cyclist, brother of Piotr
Piotr Wadecki (born 1973), Polish cyclist

See also
Wodecki